The Family Album  is a new-age album by Rick Wakeman for which he recorded a song for every member of his family including his parents, pets and even his computer.

Years later, after divorcing his wife Nina and the passing of his parents, Wakeman has stated he no longer listens to this album as it brings him sadness. The original vinyl edition of the album only contained 12 tracks in a different running order. "Wiggles", "The Day After The Fair" and Mackintosh" were omitted.

Track listing
"Black Beauty" (black rabbit) 3.43
"Adam" (Rick's 2nd son) 2.43
"Jemma" (Rick & Nina's daughter) 3.35
"Benjamin" (Rick's 3rd son) 3.16
"Oscar" (Rick & Nina's son) 5.02
"Oliver" (Rick's 1st son) 3.18
"Nina" (Rick's wife) 5.16
"Wiggles" (black & white rabbit) 2.53
"Chloe" (German Shepherd) 3.59
"Kookie" (Cat) 3.52
"Tilly" (Golden Retriever) 4.44
"Mum" 4.48
"Dad" 3.39
"The Day After The Fair" 4.23
"Mackintosh" 3.40

Note: The main melody for "Nina" was later used by Wakeman for "The Meeting", a song from the 1989 album Anderson Bruford Wakeman Howe.

Personnel
 Rick Wakeman - keyboards

Production
 John Burns - engineer

References

Rick Wakeman albums
1987 albums